N-Acetylmuramic acid (NAM or MurNAc) is an organic compound with the chemical formula . It is a monomer of peptidoglycan in most bacterial cell walls, which is built from alternating units of N-acetylglucosamine (GlcNAc) and N-acetylmuramic acid, cross-linked by oligopeptides at the lactic acid residue of MurNAc. 

MurNAc is a monosaccharide derivative of N-acetylglucosamine.

Formation of NAM
NAM is an addition product of phosphoenolpyruvate and N-acetylglucosamine. This addition happens exclusively in the cell cytoplasm.

Clinical significance
N-Acetylmuramic acid (MurNAc) is part of the peptidoglycan polymer of bacterial cell walls. MurNAc is covalently linked to N-acetylglucosamine and may also be linked through the hydroxyl on carbon number 4 to the carbon of L-alanine. A pentapeptide composed of L-alanyl-D-isoglutaminyl-L-lysyl-D-alanyl-D-alanine is added to the MurNAc in the process of making the peptidoglycan strands of the cell wall.

Synthesis of NAM is inhibited by fosfomycin.

NAG and NAM cross-linking can be inhibited by antibiotics to inhibit pathogens from growing within the body. Therefore, both NAG and NAM are valuable polymers in medicinal research.

References

See also
Amino sugar
Glucosamine

Amino sugars
Monosaccharide derivatives
Monosaccharides
Membrane biology